The London cast album of The King and I was issued in 1953 with Valerie Hobson as Anna and Herbert Lom as the king and featuring Muriel Smith as Lady Thiang, with Doreen Duke and Jan Mazarus as Tuptim and Lun Tha. The record was issued in the UK on Philips Records (BBL 7002 with a mauve framed turquoise and white design LP sleeve), and by Stet Records in the US (DS 15014 with a flame pink-bordered white and red design LP sleeve).

Track list
Overture	
I Whistle a Happy Tune	
My Lord and Master	
Hello, Young Lovers	
March of the Royal Siamese Children	
A Puzzlement	
Getting to Know You	
We Kiss In a Shadow	
Shall I Tell You What I Think of You?	
Something Wonderful	
I Have Dreamed	
Shall We Dance?

References

1953 albums
Cast recordings
The King and I